Mahananda Sapkota (1896–1977) was a Nepalese social worker, etymologist, linguist, and poet. He received several national awards for his contributions to poetry. His social work focused on education and social awareness particularly in eastern Nepal. A statue of him stands in Inaruwa of Sunsari District.

His original name was Yagyanidhi Sapkota and his name was registered as Mahananda when he enrolled in a school in Tezpur in Assam, India. As his mother moved to Tezpur in Assam, she took him along with her. He studied till 7th grade in a government school there. From Dharanidhar Koirala he learnt about Nepali literature and was inspired to write poems.

When Mahananda Sapkota returned to Nepal. He established schools in many places and persuaded people to educate their children.

He received Madan Puraskar for his book Nepali Nirbachan ko Ruprekha.

Places named after him
Guru Kul Marga, Biratnagar 
Mahananda crossroad, Inaruwa 
Mahananda Intersection, Dhulabari 
Mahnanda Park, Ilam
Sapkota (crater)

Major publications
 Aante (I venture) 
 Annu, Asha, Ashu (Annu, hope and tears) 
 Aahuti (offering) 
 Apungo (a sacred edible powder made of wheat, sugar offered in religious ceremony) 
 Bishal Nepal (Great Nepal) 
 Sukha ko bato yasto (the road to happiness) 
 Mana Lahari (The song of heart)
Nepali Nirbachan ko Ruprekha.

See also
List of Nepalese poets
Bhanubhakta Acharya
Indra Bahadur Rai

References

External links 
Sapkota appears on stamps in Nepal
Google cache of Kathmandu Post article regarding Sapkota statue

1896 births
1977 deaths
Nepalese male poets
20th-century poets
Linguists from Nepal
20th-century linguists